David Jeffrey Jones (born October 25, 1961) is a former American football offensive lineman in the National Football League for the Detroit Lions, the Denver Broncos, and the Washington Redskins.  He played college football at the University of Texas and was drafted in the eighth round of the 1984 NFL Draft.

1961 births
Living people
American football offensive linemen
Detroit Lions players
Denver Broncos players
Washington Redskins players
Texas Longhorns football players